Dzwola  is a village in Janów Lubelski County, Lublin Voivodeship, in eastern Poland. It is the seat of the gmina (administrative district) called Gmina Dzwola.
Very popular words in Dzwola: "sput", "żnij rów", "zgon".
The village has a population of 936.

References

Dzwola